Devin Michael Gray (born June 15, 1995) is an American football wide receiver for the Philadelphia Stars of the United States Football League (USFL). He played college football at Cincinnati.

Professional career

Atlanta Falcons
Gray signed with the Atlanta Falcons as an undrafted free agent on May 1, 2018. He was waived on September 1, 2018 and was signed to the practice squad the next day. He signed a reserve/future contract with the Falcons on December 31, 2018.

On August 31, 2019, Gray was waived by the Falcons. He was re-signed to the practice squad on October 23, 2019. He signed a reserve/future contract with the Falcons on December 31, 2019.

On September 5, 2020, Gray was waived by the Falcons. He was signed to their practice squad on November 23, 2020. He was elevated to the active roster on January 2, 2021, for the team's week 17 game against the Tampa Bay Buccaneers, and reverted to the practice squad after the game. His practice squad contract with the team expired after the season on January 11, 2021.

Baltimore Ravens
Gray signed a one-year deal with the Baltimore Ravens on June 3, 2021, he was released in the final roster cuts on August 30, 2021 and re-signed to the practice squad shortly after. On September 27, 2021, he was released.

Philadelphia Stars
Gray was selected in the 13th round of the 2022 USFL Draft by the Philadelphia Stars. He was transferred to the team's inactive roster on April 22, 2022, with an ankle injury. He was transferred to the active roster on April 30.

Kansas City Chiefs
On August 6, 2022, Gray signed with the Kansas City Chiefs. He was released on August 16, 2022.

Second stint with Stars
Gray re-signed with the Philadelphia Stars on October 5, 2022.

Statistics

References

External links
Atlanta Falcons bio
Cincinnati Bearcats bio

1995 births
Living people
American football wide receivers
Atlanta Falcons players
Baltimore Ravens players
Cincinnati Bearcats football players
Houston Roughnecks players
Kansas City Chiefs players
Players of American football from Nevada
Sportspeople from Reno, Nevada
Philadelphia Stars (2022) players